The discography of Ja Rule, an American rapper. He has released seven studio albums and twenty singles.

Albums

Studio albums

Compilation albums

Mixtapes

Singles

As lead artist

As featured artist

Other charted songs

Guest appearances

Notes 

A  "Reign", originally released on The Last Temptation as "Murder Reigns" and also known as "The Reign", did not enter the Hot R&B/Hip-Hop Songs chart, but peaked at number 2 on the Bubbling Under R&B/Hip-Hop Singles chart, which acts as a 25-song extension to the Hot R&B/Hip-Hop Songs chart.
B  "The Grand Finale" did not enter the Billboard Hot 100, but peaked at number 17 on the Bubbling Under Hot 100 Singles chart, which acts as a 25-song extension to the Hot 100.
C  "Bad Boy" did not enter the Hot R&B/Hip-Hop Songs chart, but peaked at number 1 on the Bubbling Under R&B/Hip-Hop Singles chart, which acts as a 25-song extension to the Hot R&B/Hip-Hop Songs chart.
D  "Streets Raised Me" did not enter the Hot R&B/Hip-Hop Songs chart, but peaked at number 1 on the Bubbling Under R&B/Hip-Hop Singles chart, which acts as a 25-song extension to the Hot R&B/Hip-Hop Songs chart.

References

Hip hop discographies
Discographies of American artists